The Indian Military Academy (IMA) is one of the oldest military academies in India, and trains officers for the Indian Army. Located in Dehradun, Uttarakhand, it was established in 1932 following a recommendation by a military committee set up under the chairmanship of General (later Field Marshal) Sir Philip Chetwode. From a class of 40 male cadets in 1932, IMA now has a sanctioned capacity of 1,650. Cadets undergo a training course varying between 3 and 16 months depending on entry criteria. On completion of the course at IMA cadets are permanently commissioned into the army as Lieutenants.

Cadets in IMA are organized into a regiment with four battalions of four companies each. The academy's mission, to train future military leaders of the Indian Army, goes hand in hand with the character building enshrined in the IMA honour code, warrior code and motto. Cadets take part in a variety of sports, adventure activities, physical training, drills, weapons training and leadership development activities.

The academy's alumni include six recipients of India's highest military decoration, the Param Vir Chakra. Other achievements by alumni include 73 Military Crosses, 17 Ashoka Chakras, 84 Maha Vir Chakras and 41 Kirti Chakras. In 2017, Lieutenant Ummer Fayaz Parray was the 847th name to be engraved on the IMA War Memorial, which honours alumni of the academy who have fallen in the course of action.

Up to 1 October 2019, the 87th Raising Day, over 61,000 gentleman cadets had graduated and over 3,000 foreign cadets from over 30 other states, including Afghanistan, Singapore, Zambia, and Malaysia, had attended IMA for pre-commission training. Alumni have gone on to become Chief and Vice-Chief of Army Staff, Olympians and politicians. Foreign alumni have also done well in their countries, going on to becomes chiefs of their respective militaries, prime ministers, presidents and politicians.

History

Demands for an Indian military training academy

During the Indian independence movement, Indian leaders recognised the need for a local military institution to meet the needs of an armed force loyal to sovereign India. The Indianisation of the officer cadre of the army began in 1901, but it was only for the elite, and after training they were not allowed into the regular army. The British Raj was reluctant to commission Indian officers or permit local officer training. In 1905, natives could officer only Indian troops and by rank were not equal to commissioned British officers. Up to the outbreak of the First World War, the highest rank to which a native soldier of India could rise was Subedar, a rank lower than the lowermost officer rank of Subaltern.

But following the Indian military performance in the First World War, the Montagu–Chelmsford Reforms facilitated the officer training of 10 Indian commissioned officers at the Royal Military College, Sandhurst. In 1922, the Prince of Wales Royal Indian Military College (now known as the Rashtriya Indian Military College or just RIMC) was set up in Dehradun to prepare young Indians for admission to Sandhurst. The Indianisation of the Army started with the commissioning of 31 Indian officers. Among this first batch of officers to be commissioned was Sam Hormusji Framji Jamshedji Manekshaw, who became the Chief of Army Staff of the Indian Army in 1969 and later the first Indian Field Marshal.
Despite demands from the Indian officers, the British resisted expansion of the Indian officer cadre. Indian leaders pressed the issue at the first Round Table Conference in 1930. The establishment of an Indian officer training college was one of the few concessions made at the conference. The Indian Military College Committee, set up under the chairmanship of General Sir Philip Chetwode, in 1931 recommended the establishment of an Indian Military Academy in Dehradun to produce forty commissioned officers twice a year following two and a half years of training.

Inauguration to Independence

The Government of India transferred the former property of the Railway Staff College of the Indian Railways, with its 206-acre campus and associated infrastructure, to the Indian Military Academy. Brigadier L.P. Collins was appointed the first Commandant and the first batch of 40 gentleman cadets (GC), as IMA trainees are known, began their training on 1 October 1932. The institute was inaugurated on 10 December 1932 by General Sir Philip Chetwode, 7th Bt. Chetwode was promoted to being a Field Marshal the following year, in February 1933.
In 1934, before the first batch had passed out, Viceroy Lord Willingdon presented the first colours to the academy on behalf of King George V. The first batch of cadets to graduate the academy, graduating in December 1934, now known as the Pioneers, included Field Marshal Sam Manekshaw, General Muhammad Musa and General Smith Dun, who became the Army Chiefs of India, Pakistan, and Burma, respectively. General Dun graduated at the top of his class at IMA and also commanded the passing out parade for the first course. The second, third, fourth and fifth batches were called, respectively, Immortals, Invincible, Stalwarts and Bahadurs.Through the first 16 regular courses that passed out of the academy, until May 1941, 524 officers were commissioned. But the outbreak of the Second World War resulted in an unprecedented increase in the number of entrants, a temporary reduction in the training period to six months and an expansion of the campus. A total of 3,887 officers were commissioned between August 1941 and January 1946, including 710 British officers for the British Army. The academy reverted to its original two and a half year course of training at the end of the war. During the final years before Independence, the academy navigated the role of training officers for both colonial and postcolonial armies.

Post-Independence
Following the Independence of India in August 1947 and the subsequent partition into Pakistan, a number of British officers who were trainers in the academy left for Britain, while Pakistani cadets left for Pakistan. A total of 110 Pakistani cadets then continued their training at Pakistan Military Academy, Kakul. Brigadier Thakur Mahadeo Singh, DSO, was appointed the first Indian Commandant of the academy. The 189 GCs who graduated on 20 December 1947 were the first class from IMA to be commissioned into a free India.

In late 1947, the Chiefs of Staff of the Indian Armed Forces, following the recommendation of a 1946 committee headed by Field Marshal Sir Claude Auchinleck, decided to initiate an action plan to commission a new Joint Services training academy. In the interim, they decided to conduct Joint Services training at IMA. The academy was renamed the Armed Forces Academy and a new Joint Services Wing (JSW) was commissioned on 1 January 1949, while training of Army officers continued in the Military Wing. The academy was renamed as the National Defence Academy (NDA) on 1 January 1950, ahead of India becoming a Republic. In December 1954, when the new Joint Services training academy was established in Khadakwasla, near Pune, the NDA name along with the Joint Services Wing was transferred to Khadakwasla. The academy in Dehradun was then rechristened as the Military College. Brigadier M.M. Khanna, MVC was the first IMA alumni to be appointed Commandant of IMA at the end of 1956. In 1960, the founding name, Indian Military Academy, was reinstated. On 10 December 1962, on the 30th anniversary of the academy's inauguration, the second President of India, Dr. Sarvapalli Radhakrishnan, presented new colours to the academy.

After the Sino-Indian War of 1962, special measures were introduced. From 1963 until August 1964, the duration of regular classes was truncated, emergency courses were initiated, and new living quarters for cadets were added. However, unlike previous wars, the Indo-Pakistan War of 1965 and that of 1971 did not disrupt Academy training or graduation schedules. On 11 February 1971, William G Westmoreland, Chief of Staff, United States Army, visited the academy.

In 1976, the four battalions of the academy were renamed after Field Marshal Kodandera Madappa Cariappa, General Kodandera Subayya Thimayya, Field Marshal Sam Manekshaw and Lieutenant General Premindra Singh Bhagat, with two companies each. On 15 December 1976, then President Fakhruddin Ali Ahmed presented new colours to the academy. In the 1970s, the Army Cadet College (ACC) was shifted from Pune to Dehradun, becoming a wing of IMA. In 2006, the ACC was merged into IMA as the fifth battalion, the Siachen Battalion.

By 1 October 2019, the 87th Raising Day, the number of GCs to have graduated from IMA stood at 61,762, including foreign alumni from 33 friendly countries. Foreign countries included Angola, Afghanistan, Bhutan, Myanmar, Ghana, Iraq, Jamaica, Kazakhstan, Kyrgyzstan, Malaysia, Nepal, Nigeria, Palestine, Philippines, Singapore, Sri Lanka, Tajikistan, Tanzania, Tonga, Uganda, Yemen and Zambia.

Campus
The academy is in the Doon Valley (Dronacharya Ashram), Uttarakhand. National Highway 72, the Dehradun–Chakrata Road, separates the North and South Campus. The Chetwode Hall on the drill square, built in 1930, houses the administrative headquarters of IMA and is also the hub of academic training. It has lecture halls, computer labs and a cafe. On the opposite side of the drill square is the Khetarpal Auditorium. Opened in 1982, it has a seating capacity of over 1,500. A newer wing of the Chetwode building, added in 1938, houses the central library. It has over 100,000 volumes and subscriptions to hundreds of periodicals from across the world, in addition to multimedia sections. In addition, there are two branch libraries closer to the cadet barracks across the campus.

The IMA museum on the campus displays artifacts of historic importance such as the pistol of Lieutenant General Amir Abdullah Khan Niazi of the Pakistan Army, given upon his surrender to Lt. Gen Jagjit Singh Aurora after signing the instrument of surrender to end the Bangladesh liberation war of 1971. A captured Pakistan Army Patton tank is also on the grounds.

Athletic facilities
The South Campus of IMA includes facilities such as the Somnath Stadium, with a seating capacity of 3,000, the Salaria Aquatic Centre, consisting of an Olympic sized swimming pool, and the Hoshiar Singh Gymnasium. The North Campus includes the polo ground along the Tons River. Tons Valley to the northwest of the campus is used for para-dropping, para-gliding, skydiving and battle training. Other facilities include stables with a stud farm, a small arms shooting range, and épée fencing from the modern pentathlon.

War Memorial

The IMA War Memorial commemorates the alumni of the academy who died in action. At the sanctum sanctorum of the memorial is a bronze statue of a gentleman cadet with a sword presenting arms. The memorial was inaugurated by Field Marshal Manekshaw on 17 November 1999, shortly after the conclusion of the Kargil War. IMA officers led and fought in the war, with some of them becoming household names in India for their gallantry. Among their ranks were two Param Vir Chakra recipients and eight Maha Vir Chakra recipients. In 2017, Lieutenant Ummer Fayaz Parray was the 847th name to be engraved on the War Memorial.

Gentleman cadet life
There are various modes of entry into IMA, which include: on graduation from National Defence Academy, on graduation from Army Cadet College (a wing of IMA itself), direct entry through the Combined Defence Services Examination followed by SSB exams, and technical entry under university and college schemes. While those who gain entry into IMA go on to become permanently commissioned officers, those who go to the other officer training academies such as Officer Training Academy, Chennai are trained for short service commission. Depending on entry criteria married or unmarried male candidates are allowed to voluntarily apply for the course. Lady Cadets are not inducted into the Indian Army through IMA, though there has been talk of the same. IMA has a sanctioned capacity of 1,650.

A trainee on admission to IMA is referred to as a gentleman cadet (GC). One reason for this is that the academy expects its graduates to uphold the highest moral and ethical values. Inscribed in the oak paneling at the eastern entrance of the Chetwode Hall is the academy's credo, excerpted from the speech of Field Marshal Chetwode at the inauguration of the academy in 1932:

The freshman GCs hail from diverse backgrounds from all parts of India. The training is action-filled, intense, diverse, and fast. Significant emphasis is placed on self discipline. The official website of the Indian Army describes the training as "a test of one's mettle and capabilities, and in psychological terms a foretaste of what the trainees would face in the battlefield". On passing out GCs are permanently commissioned into the Army as Lieutenants.

Organization
IMA cadets are organized as a regiment with four training battalions, of four companies each. There were sixteen companies in 2013. Battalions are named after generals of the Indian Army (except for Siachen Battalion), while companies are named after battles in which the Army has participated.

Cariappa Battalion: Kohima Company, Naushera Company, Poonch Company
Thimayya Battalion: Alamein Company, Meiktila Company, Sangro Company
Manekshaw Battalion: Imphal Company, Zojila Company, Jessore Company
Bhagat Battalion: Sinhgarh Company, Keren Company, Cassino Company
Siachen Battalion: Erstwhile Army Cadet College

Training
Technical graduates, ex-NDA, ex-ACC and university entry cadets undergo training at IMA for one year. Direct entry cadets train for one and a half years while the Territorial Army officers course is three months.

IMA's mission is to train future military leaders of the Indian Army. Physical training, drills, weapons training and leadership development form the focus of the training. Character building is embedded in the honour code of IMA "I shall not lie, steal or cheat, nor tolerate those who do so". From the honour code came the adoption of "The Gentleman Cadet's Resolve" and in turn the Credo, Honour Code and Resolve became the academy Trishul for conduct of cadets. The "Warrior Code" of IMA which has been adopted from the "Bhagwat Gita", the punch line of it being "I am a Warrior, fighting is my dharma;" also talks of compassion.

Training is broadly categorised into character building, service subjects and academic subjects. Service subjects give basic military knowledge up to the standard required for an infantry platoon commander. Academic subjects provide the cadet with a general education so as to enable a basic knowledge in professional subjects as well as enable cadets to clearly express themselves both verbally and in writing. In the early 1970s the service subjects to academic subjects ratio was 16:9 (64% service to 36% academic); this ratio was enhanced for technical graduates to a ratio of 83% service subjects and 27% academic subjects. Over time this ratio varied as per regular course entry or technical entry, and changed as terms were increased or decreased.
Weapon training includes the close quarter battle range, the location of miss and hit target system, jungle lane shooting and the team battle shooting range. The curriculum is reviewed from time to time and adapted to whatever the current situation the country is in. Cadets are also put in roles where they need to think like the enemy such as in Exercise Chindit where some GCs are asked to act as terrorists while others have to capture them. They are trained in various forms of warfare, including conventional war, proxy war, low intensity conflict, and counter-insurgency. An integral part of the training are the ustads or instructors numbering about 200. The ustads are responsible for aspects of training including drills, weapons training and field craft.

Games and sports include cross country, hockey, basketball, polo, athletics, football, aquatics, volleyball and boxing. There is also an annual sports meet with other military academies in India. Adventure activities undertaken at the academy include trekking, cycling, and rock climbing. In 1997 a cadet died during a boxing session. In 2007 a cadet died in a grenade blast. In 2009 a cadet died by drowning. Between 2017 and 2019, three cadets died during training. Two cadets died of exhaustion during a 10 km run, while a third died after slipping into a gorge during a night navigation exercise. The academy requires that cadets get insurance against death and disability during training.

Passing out parade 

One of the most well known traditions in the IMA is the passing out parade (POP). Before the cadets begin the POP, the band plays an aarti, allowing the cadets to pray to their respective gods. Traditionally, the adjutant leads the parade. In 2019, the reviewing officer for the 136th parade was Lt. Gen. Cherish Mathson. IMA has adopted a song penned by Javed Akhtar for its POPs — Bharat mata teri kasam, tere rakshak rahenge hum.

During the POP, a civilian dignitary may also make a speech, as was the case during the passing out parade in 1962 when the President Dr. Sarvepalli. Radhakrishnan addressed the cadets, and in 2007 when the Prime Minister Manmohan Singh did so. In 1982, during the golden jubilee, Prime Minister Indira Gandhi inspected the POP while in 1992, the President R. Venkataraman reviewed the diamond jubilee POP (winter term). In 2006, President APJ Abdul Kalam was the reviewing officer at the POP.

The finale is the antim pag (final step), where cadets take the last step into Chetwode Hall. However the POP on 11 June 1961 was called off without the final step due to weather, the only instance where this has happened for a passing out batch. The tradition of cap-flinging during the passing out parade has a long past but it was replaced by the cadets doing celebratory pushups. The passing out also consists of traditions such as presentation of a "Sword of Honour" to the best GC. Notable recipients of the Sword of Honour include the first Chief of Defence Staff Bipin Rawat (in 1978) and the Olympian and union minister Col. Rajyavardhan Singh Rathore (in 1990).

Notable alumni
Over 61,000 GCs have graduated from IMA. IMA alumni have led and fought in every conflict in which the Indian Army has served. Numerous alumni have earned laurels, died in action and been honoured with gallantry awards. As of 2016, alumni from the academy were recipients of 7 Param Vir Chakras, 17 Ashoka Chakras, 84 Maha Vir Chakras and 257 Vir Chakras. Alumni were also recipients of 2 Sarvattam Yudh Seva Medals, 28 Uttam Yudh Seva Medals, 48 Kirti Chakras and 191 Shaurya Chakras. Battle casualties from the academy total 817 alumni.

In 1941, during World War II, then 2nd Lieutenant Premindra Singh Bhagat was awarded the Victoria Cross. Captain Mateen Ahmed Ansari and Captain Sartaj Singh were awarded the George Cross and George Medal respectively. Lt. Siri Kanth Korla was awarded the Distinguished Service Order and the Military Cross both. 73 Military Crosses were awarded to IMA alumni during that war and over 200 alumni were killed in action. Lt. Gen. Kashmir Singh Katoch, a Padma Bhushan recipient and the military advisor to Hari Singh, the erstwhile ruler of the princely state of Kashmir, completed his military training from IMA in 1936.

During the Kargil War of 1999, the Maha Vir Chakra was awarded posthumously to Academy alumni Major Rajesh Singh Adhikari, Major Vivek Gupta, Captain Anuj Nayyar, Captain Neikezhakuo Kenguruse. Lieutenant Balwan Singh,Major Padamapani Acharya and Major Sonum Wangchuk were also awarded the Maha Vir Chakra they were from OTA. Lt. Triveni Singh was posthumously awarded the Ashok Chakra Award.

Alumni who have been honoured with the Param Vir Chakra include Major Somnath Sharma (posthumous), Captain Gurbachan Singh Salaria (posthumous), Lieutenant Colonel Hoshiar Singh, 2nd Lieutenant Arun Khetarpal (posthumous), Captain Vikram Batra (posthumous), and Captain Manoj Kumar Pandey (posthumous).

Sam Manekshaw, an alumnus of IMA, was the first Indian to become a Field Marshal. Other graduates of IMA include the current Chief of Army Staff (COAS) and a number of past COASs including General Bipin Rawat, General Vijay Kumar Singh, General Bikram Singh, General Deepak Kapoor and General Sunith Francis Rodrigues. A number of Vice Chief of Army Staff are also alumni of IMA such as Lt. Gen. Philip Campose and Lt. Gen. Sarath Chand. Lt. Gen. Z.C. Bakshi (PVSM, MVC, VrC, VSM), an alumnus of IMA, was "India's most decorated General". Lt. Gen. Harbakhsh Singh, a 1933 batch GC of IMA, also a Japanese POW for three years, was the Western Army Commander during the Indo-Pakistani War of 1965. Numerous GOC-in-C have passed out from IMA such as Lt. Gen. Alok Singh Kler, the current GOC-in-C of the South Western Command (Sapta Shakti Command).

The academy has produced Olympians such as Rajyavardhan Singh Rathore, a 1990 Sword of Honour recipient, who won a silver medal at the 2004 Athens Olympic Games and went on to become the sports minister; Colonel Balbir Singh Kular scored three goals in hockey during the 1968 Olympics and was captain of the Indian team in the 1971 World Cup; Lt. Col. Haripal Kaushik and Lt. Col. Ali Iqtidar Shah Dara were also hockey players who won gold medals in the Olympics. IMA alumni who have received India's highest award for sports, the Arjuna Award, include Major General Mohammed Amin Naik for his achievements in rowing and Brigadier Raj Manchanda for his achievements in squash among others. Lt. Col. Satyendra Verma carried out the first base jump in the country. Major D. P. Singh is India's first blade runner. Many alumni have conquered peaks such as Mount Everest.

Foreign alumni
Some of IMA's foreign alumni include:

 General M. A. G. Osmani – Commander-in-Chief of the Bangladesh Mukti Bahini
 Lt. General Khwaja Wasiuddin - General in Pakistan Army and Bangladesh Army, member of Nawab of Dhaka family
 General Yahya Khan – Commander-in-Chief of Pakistan Army and third President of Pakistan
 General Muhammad Zia-ul-Haq – Commander-in-Chief of Pakistan Army and sixth President of Pakistan
Lt. General. Sahabzada Yaqub Khan – Pakistan Ambassador to the United States and later the Foreign Minister
 General Muhammad Musa Khan – Commander-in-Chief of Pakistan Army
 Lt. General Habibullah Khan Khattak – Chief of General Staff, Pakistan Army
 Captain Raja Muhammad Sarwar – Recipient of Nishan-i-Haider, Pakistan Army
 Major Tufail Mohammad – Recipient of Nishan-i-Haider, Pakistan Army
 Tun Hussein Onn – third Prime Minister of Malaysia
 General Ibrahim Ismail – Chief of Staff of the Malaysian Armed Forces
 General Ibrahim Babangida – former military president of Nigeria
 Captain Tunku Ismail Sultan Ibrahim – Crown prince of Johor state, Malaysia
 Maj. General Smith Dun – Chief of Army Staff Myanmar Army, Sword of Honour IMA
Sher Mohammad Abbas Stanikzai – an Afghan Taliban politician
Sultan Sallehuddin — Sultan of Kedah State, Malaysia

In 2019, foreign cadets taking part in the spring term passing out parade numbered 77 with Afghanistan having the most foreign gentleman cadets graduating, 45 in total. In the POP on 10 December 2005, Penjor Gyeltshen, an officer from the Royal Bhutan Army, became the first foreigner since India's independence to win the Sword of Honour (presented to the best cadet). In 1972, Prince Tu'ipelehake was the first Tongan to attend IMA.

In popular culture

The 2004 Bollywood film Lakshya is partly shot in IMA as well as the Tamil film Vaaranam Aayiram. In 2015 Tanushree Podder penned a novel called On The Double: Drills, Drama, and Dare-Devilry at the Indian Military Academy, a fictional portrayal of a gentleman cadet's life. Making of a Warrior, a documentary by Dipti Bhalla and Kunal Verma, provides an inside look at IMA's culture, traditions and training regime.

See also

Air Force Academy, Dundigal Hyderabad
Indian Naval Academy, Ezhimala
Indian National Defence University
Military academies in India 
Officers Training Academy, Chennai
National Defence College, New Delhi
Sainik School

Notes and references

Notes

References

Bibliography

Further reading 
 
 
 

Military academies
Military education and training in India
Military academies of India
Education in Dehradun
Educational institutions established in 1932
1932 establishments in India